1871 was the 85th season of cricket in England since the foundation of Marylebone Cricket Club (MCC). Derbyshire County Cricket Club became a first-class club and the last matches were played by Cambridgeshire, who in the days of Bob Carpenter, the first Tom Hayward and George Tarrant had been one of the leading cricket counties.

W. G. Grace surpassed his previous season's record of 1,808 runs and his 1869 average of 57.39 by scoring 2,739 at the outstanding average of 78.25 at a time when most pitches were still unrolled and very dangerous to batsmen – though the heavy roller was already producing major improvements to Lord's and eliminating the bottom-of-the-stump shooters. These records were not beaten until Arthur Shrewsbury averaged 78.71 in 1887 and Ranjitsinhji scored 2,780 runs in 1896.

Playing record (by county)

Leading batsmen (qualification 15 innings)

Leading bowlers (qualification 800 balls)

Events 
 Cambridgeshire County Cricket Club played one match in the 1871 season and ceased to be a first-class county thereafter. This was blamed on the reluctance of the leading players in the county to appear for the Cambridgeshire side, preferring to play for the touring elevens.
 In Derbyshire's opening season the club played its initial first-class match v. Lancashire at Old Trafford on 26 and 27 May.
 Middlesex County Cricket Club, after being threatened with disbanding due to lack of a ground, acquired the Lillie Bridge ground in West Brompton as a "home" venue, but played only one match there.
 Prince's Cricket Ground was opened on former market gardens in Chelsea by two brothers dissatisfied with the condition of the Lord's pitch – ironically Lord's improved markedly this very season. Prince's was a major ground in the middle 1870s but was built-on between 1877 and 1886.
 28 June: William Game, with 281 for Sherborne against Motcombe, hit the first double century in a public school game
 W. G. Grace caused a sensation by scoring 2,739 runs – this being the first time 2,000 was exceeded. He was to repeat the feat in 1876 and 1887, but no other player was to equal Grace until Andrew Stoddart and William Gunn did so in 1893. Grace's dominance is shown by comparing his figures for the season with the next best. Richard Daft had the next highest average among batsmen playing 10 innings or more, with 37.66, less than half Grace's figure. Harry Jupp had the next highest runs aggregate, with 1068.
 With ten centuries, Grace beat his 1869 record of six in one season. This was not equalled until Ranjitsinhji in 1896 and beaten by Ranji in 1900. No other batsman made more than a single hundred.
 Surrey played thirteen county games without a single win, an ignominy not surpassed until Derbyshire in 1897 played sixteen winless games. Surrey were not to fail to win a single county game again until 2008.

References

Annual reviews 
 John Lillywhite's Cricketer's Companion (Green Lilly), Lillywhite, 1872
 James Lillywhite's Cricketers' Annual (Red Lilly), Lillywhite, 1872
 John Wisden's Cricketers' Almanack, 1872

Notes 
Hampshire, though regarded until 1885 as first-class, played no inter-county matches between 1868 and 1869 or 1871 and 1874

External links 
 CricketArchive – season summaries

1871 in English cricket
English cricket seasons in the 19th century